Battle of al-Hasakah may refer to:

 Battle of al-Hasakah (2015)
 Battle of al-Hasakah (2016)
 Battle of al-Hasakah (2022)